Pernety may refer to:

Pernety (Paris Métro), a station
Pernety (surname)